Konstantin Anikenko (born November 9, 1992) is a Ukrainian professional basketball player for Kyiv-Basket of the UA SuperLeague and FIBA Europe Cup.

References

External links
 Eurobasket profile
 Realgm profile
 BIBL profile
 FIBA Profile

1992 births
Living people
BC Budivelnyk players
BC Dnipro-Azot players
BC Odesa players
Centers (basketball)
Sportspeople from Odesa
Ukrainian men's basketball players